Ganesh Kumar Pahadi is a Nepalese Politician and was Minister of Federal Affairs and General Administration. He was serving as the Member Of House Of Representatives (Nepal) elected from Sindhuli-1, Province No. 3. He is member of the  Communist Party of Nepal (UML).

References

Living people
Nepal MPs 2017–2022
Nepal Communist Party (NCP) politicians
Communist Party of Nepal (Unified Marxist–Leninist) politicians
1970 births